Decksandrumsandrockandroll is the only studio album by English electronic music duo Propellerheads. It was originally released by Wall of Sound on 26 January 1998 in the United Kingdom. In the United States, it was released by DreamWorks Records with a different track listing.

The album peaked at number 6 on the UK Albums Chart, as well as number 100 on the Billboard 200 chart. It was nominated for the Mercury Music Prize in 1998. As of 1999, it had sold 200,000 copies.

"Take California" was selected by Apple for their iPod debut commercial in 2001. It features a man shaking his head while listening to the track on his Mac, then drags the song onto the device including his "Favorites" playlist. He puts on his earbuds dancing to the song then leaves. It ends with the iPod wordmark and "Think different" slogan showing up.

Track listing

Personnel
Credits adapted from liner notes.

Propellerheads
 Alex Gifford – production, programming
 Will White – drums

Other musicians
 Shirley Bassey – vocals on "History Repeating"
 David Arnold   – orchestral arrangement on "On Her Majesty's Secret Service"
 Chris Lawson – guitar on "History Repeating", "Bang On!" and "Cominagetcha"
 Mike Thomas – guitar on "Bigger?"
 De La Soul – vocals on "360° (Oh Yeah?)"
 Jungle Brothers – vocals on "You Want It Back"
 Memo Acevedo – percussion

Technical crew
 Mike Marsh – mastering
 Prince – engineering
 Dave Trump – engineering assistance
 Blue Source – art direction
 Lee Strickland – photography

Charts

Weekly charts

Year-end charts

Certifications

References

External links
 
 

1998 debut albums
Propellerheads albums
Wall of Sound (record label) albums
DreamWorks Records albums